Asheville Rides Transit (ART) is the municipally-owned operator of public transportation in Asheville, North Carolina. The agency provides service from 5:30 a.m. to 10:30 p.m. on Monday through Saturday; and from 8:30 a.m. to 6:30 p.m. on Sundays and Holidays. The standard fare is $1.  The main and only station is located at 49 Coxe Avenue, Asheville, NC 28801.

The management company for ART is RATP Dev.

Route list

Schedule and route changes were made in January 2015.

Holidays

 ART has no service on Thanksgiving and Christmas Day.  Service is suspended after 6:30 p.m. on Christmas Eve, 2014.  Limited service is provided on New Year's Day, Martin Luther King, Jr. Day, Good Friday, Memorial Day, Independence Day, and Labor Day.

Transit Master Plan
In 2009, the City of Asheville commissioned a plan for an overhaul of the transit system. The consulting team, HDR Engineering of the Carolinas (HDR), conducted rider surveys and held several public input events. The final report recommended many changes, including adding Sunday service on the most popular routes, removing Saturday service on some routes, and ending the practice of renumbering evening routes.

Route changes began to occur in conjunction with the annual "Strive Not to Drive" week, in late May 2012.

The plan also recommended purchasing a few new buses at a time so as to stagger the retirement dates of older buses. In early 2011, several new hybrid buses entered the fleet as the first implementation of this recommendation.

As part of the plan, the name of ART was changed from Asheville Redefines Transit to Asheville Rides Transit.

Funding

For FY 2012-2013, ART's operating budget was $5 million.  The entire Transit Fund revenue is derived from three primary sources: federal and state grant funding ($2.8 million), local tax support ($1.2 million), and passenger charges.

Paratransit Service

Asheville contracts with Mountain Mobility to provide paratransit service.  This service is provided within  of fixed ART routes and within the City of Asheville.  This service is mandated by the Americans with Disabilities Act.

Strive Not To Drive

Strive Not To Drive is a week-long program in the City of Asheville that promotes multimodal transit and the environment. In 2014, it included such events as a Ride of Silence, a Leadership Ride and a reduced fare promotion.

Bus Fleet 
ART operates a fleet of buses powered by diesel, hybrid diesel-electric, and fully electric buses made by Gillig and Proterra. In 2019, ART purchased five electric buses from Proterra, with the intention of purchasing more in the future.  In 2020, They purchased electric buses from Vicinity Motor Corp.

References

External links

Asheville Redefines Transit website
Art System Maps and Schedules 
2014 Holiday hours for routes C, N1, N3, S3, S4, E1, E2, W1, W3
Asheville Transit Committee
Asheville gets nine new buses
Buses under new management
Strive Not to Drive website
Mountain Mobility website
Nextbus Asheville bus tracking website

RATP Group
Bus transportation in North Carolina
Asheville, North Carolina
Transportation in Buncombe County, North Carolina
Intermodal transportation authorities in North Carolina